Mohammad Malik Arshad (Urdu:; 18 May 1948 – 17 February 2021) was a Pakistani weightlifter. He competed at the 1972 Summer Olympics and the 1976 Summer Olympics (15th position). He was a bronze medalist at the 1974 Asian Games in Tehran. He also won a gold medal at the 1976 Asian Weightlifting Championships held in Bangkok.

References

External links
 

1948 births
2021 deaths
Pakistani male weightlifters
Olympic weightlifters of Pakistan
Weightlifters at the 1972 Summer Olympics
Weightlifters at the 1976 Summer Olympics
Place of birth missing
Asian Games medalists in weightlifting
Asian Games bronze medalists for Pakistan
Weightlifters at the 1974 Asian Games
Medalists at the 1974 Asian Games